Minnesota has 6,564 natural rivers and streams that cumulatively flow for . It is joined by the Minnesota River at Fort Snelling, by the St. Croix River near Hastings, by the Chippewa River at Wabasha, and by many smaller streams. The Red River, in the bed of glacial Lake Agassiz, drains the northwest part of the state northward toward Canada's Hudson Bay.

By drainage basin (watershed)
This list is arranged by drainage basin with respective tributaries indented under each larger stream's name.  The rivers and streams that flow through other states or Minnesota and other states are indicated, as well as the length of major rivers.

Great Lakes drainage basin

Lake Superior drainage basin

Lake Superior
Pigeon River (Minnesota, Ontario), 
Swamp River
Stump River, 
Lower Stump River, 
Royal River
Crocodile River
Reservation River, 
Flute Reed River, 
Brule River, 
Greenwood River, 
South Brule River
Kadunce River, 
Kimball Creek, 
Devil Track River, 
Little Devil Track River, 
Fall River, 
Cascade River, 
North Branch Cascade River
Poplar River, 
Tait River, 
Onion River, 
West Branch Onion River
Temperance River, 
Sawbill Creek, 
Kelso River, 
Vern River, 
Cross River,  
Two Island River, 
Caribou River, 
Little Manitou River, 
Manitou River, 
South Branch Manitou River
Little Marais River, -
Baptism River,  
East Branch Baptism River
West Branch Baptism River
Beaver River, 
East Branch Beaver River
West Branch Beaver River (Lake Superior)
Split Rock River, 
East Split Rock River
West Split Rock River
Gooseberry River, 
Skunk Creek, 
Little Gooseberry River, 
Encampment River
Stewart River
Little Stewart River
Knife River, 
Little Knife River, 
West Branch Knife River
Little Knife River, located in Lake County
Little Sucker River, 
Big Sucker Creek, 
French River, 
Talmadge River, 
Lester River, 
St. Louis River (Minnesota, Wisconsin), 
Pokegama River, 
Red River, 
Little River, 
Midway River, 
Pine River, 
Cloquet River, 
Us-kab-wan-ka River, 
Beaver River, 
Otter River, 
Little Cloquet River, 
West Branch Cloquet River
Langley River, 
Little Langley River, 
Artichoke River, 
Ahmik River, 
McCarty River, 
East Savanna River, 
Floodwood River, 
West Branch Floodwood River
Whiteface River, 
Little Whiteface River (South), 
Little Whiteface River (North), 
Paleface River, 
North Branch Whiteface River
South Branch Whiteface River
East Swan River, 
West Swan River, 
West Two River, 
East Two River, 
Embarrass River, 
Partridge River, 
South Branch Partridge River
East River, 
North River, 
Nemadji River, 
South Fork Nemadji River
Net River, 
Little Net River, 
North Fork Nemadji River
Blackhoof River,

Mississippi River drainage basin

The Mississippi River is the longest river flowing through Minnesota.  It originates in Lake Itasca and flows through Minnesota, Wisconsin, Iowa, Illinois, Missouri, Kentucky, Tennessee, Arkansas, Mississippi, and Louisiana.

Upper Mississippi River (below St. Anthony Falls) drainage basin

Mississippi River, ;  within Minnesota
Missouri River (Missouri, Iowa, South Dakota), 
Little Sioux River (Minnesota, Iowa), 
Ocheyedan River (Minnesota, Iowa), 
West Fork Little Sioux River
Big Sioux River (Iowa, South Dakota), 
Rock River (Iowa, Minnesota), 
Little Rock River (Iowa, Minnesota)
East Branch Rock River
Split Rock Creek (Minnesota, South Dakota), 
Pipestone Creek, 
Flandreau Creek (Minnesota, South Dakota), 
Beaver Creek (Big Sioux River tributary)
Des Moines River (Iowa, Minnesota, Missouri), 
East Fork Des Moines River (Minnesota, Iowa)
Heron Lake Outlet
Jack Creek, 
Diversion Creek
Okabena Creek
Lime Creek (Minnesota, Iowa), 
Beaver Creek (Des Moines River tributary)
Iowa River (Iowa), 
Cedar River (Minnesota, Iowa), 
Shell Rock River (Minnesota, Iowa), 
Winnebago River (Iowa), 
Lime Creek (Minnesota, Iowa), 
Little Cedar River (Iowa and Minnesota) (Iowa, Minnesota), 
Little Cedar River (Dodge County, Minnesota), 
Wapsipinicon River (Minnesota, Iowa),  
Upper Iowa River (Iowa), 
Pine Creek (Minnesota, Iowa)
Little Iowa River
North Branch Upper Iowa River
Winnebago Creek, 
Crooked Creek, 
North Fork Crooked Creek
South Fork Crooked Creek
Root River, 
North Branch Root River
Middle Branch Root River
Trout Run 
South Branch Root River
Camp Creek (Root River tributary)
Etna Creek
South Branch Etna Creek
Canfield Creek
Forestville Creek
Willow Creek
Rush Creek
Ferguson Creek
Ahrensfeld Creek
Borson Spring
Pine Creek (Rush Creek tributary)
Coolridge Creek
Hemingway Creek
South Fork Root River
Badger Creek
Beaver Creek
Pine Creek, 
Whitewater River, 
North Fork Whitewater River
Middle Fork Whitewater River
South Fork Whitewater River
Zumbro River, 
North Fork Zumbro River
Middle Fork Zumbro River
North Branch Middle Fork Zumbro River
South Branch Middle Fork Zumbro River
South Fork Zumbro River
Wells Creek,  
Hay Creek, 
Cannon River, 
North Cannon River, a distributary
Little Cannon River (Cannon River tributary), 
Straight River, 
Little Cannon River (Sabre Lake), 
Belle Creek (Cannon River tributary)
Trout Brook, 

Vermillion River, 
South Branch Vermillion River

St. Croix River drainage basin

Mississippi River
St. Croix River (Minnesota, Wisconsin), 
Sunrise River, 
North Branch Sunrise River
West Branch Sunrise River
South Branch Sunrise River
Snake River, 
Groundhouse River, 
South Fork Groundhouse River
West Fork Groundhouse River
Ann River, 
Little Ann River, 
Knife River,  
Kettle River, 
Grindstone River, 
North Branch Grindstone River
South Branch Grindstone River
Pine River, 
Willow River, 
Little Willow River, 
Moose Horn River, 
Portage River, 
West Fork Moose Horn River
Split Rock River, 
Dead Moose River, 
West Branch Kettle River
Sand Creek, 
Lower Tamarack River, 
Upper Tamarack River, 
Brown's Creek (St. Croix River tributary),

Minnesota River drainage basin

The Minnesota River is the longest river that is entirely within Minnesota.

Mississippi River
Minnesota River, 
Credit River, 
Sand Creek, 
High Island Creek, 
Rush River, 
South Branch Rush River
Middle Branch Rush River
North Branch Rush River
Blue Earth River, 
Le Sueur River, 
Maple River, 
Cobb River, 
Little Cobb River, 
Little Le Sueur River, 
Watonwan River, 
Perch Creek, 
South Fork Watonwan River
North Fork Watonwan River
Elm Creek, 
East Branch Blue Earth River
Middle Branch Blue Earth River
West Branch Blue Earth River
Little Cottonwood River, 
Cottonwood River, 
Sleepy Eye Creek, 
Plum Creek, 
Redwood River, 
Hawk Creek, 
Yellow Medicine River, 
Spring Creek, 
North Branch Yellow Medicine River
South Branch Yellow Medicine River
Chippewa River, 
Shakopee Creek, 
East Branch Chippewa River
Little Chippewa River, 
Lac qui Parle River, 
West Branch Lac qui Parle River
Pomme de Terre River, 
Yellow Bank River, 
North Fork Yellow Bank River
South Fork Yellow Bank River
Whetstone River, 
Little Minnesota River,

Upper Mississippi River, Headwaters region (above St. Anthony Falls) drainage basin

Mississippi River
Rice Creek,  
Rum River, 
West Branch Rum River
Crow River, 
North Fork Crow River, 
Middle Fork Crow River, 
Skunk River
South Fork Crow River, 
Buffalo Creek, 
Elk River, 
St. Francis River, 
West Branch St. Francis River
Snake River
Clearwater River, 
Sauk River, 
Ashley Creek, 
Watab River, 
North Fork Watab River
South Fork Watab River
Platte River, 
Skunk River, 
Two River, 
North Two River, 
South Two River, 
Little Two River, 
Swan River, 
Little Swan River, 
Spring Branch Swan River
Little Elk River, 
South Branch Little Elk River
Nokasippi River, 
Little Nokasippi River, 
Crow Wing River, 
Gull River, 
Long Prairie River, 
Partridge River, 
Little Partridge River, 
Leaf River, 
Redeye River, 
Wing River, 
Cat River, 
Shell River, 
Fish Hook River, 
Straight River
Portage River
Potato River
Blueberry River, 
Kettle River, <
Rabbit River, 
Pine River, 
Little Pine River, 
South Fork Pine River
Little Willow River, 
Ripple River, 
Rice River, 
Willow River, 
Hill River
Little Hill River
Moose River
North Fork Willow River
South Fork Willow River
Sandy River
Prairie River
Tamarack River
Little Tamarack River
West Savanna River
Swan River, 
Prairie River
West Fork Prairie River
Vermilion River, 
Deer River
Ball Club River
Leech Lake River
Bear River
Leech Lake
Boy River
Swift River
Shingobee River
Kabekona River
Necktie River
Steamboat River
First River
Pigeon River
Third River
Turtle River
North Turtle River
Gull River
Schoolcraft River, 
Little Mississippi River

Hudson Bay drainage basin

The Red River of the North is the second longest river flowing through Minnesota.  It forms the border with North Dakota and flows north to Manitoba, Canada.

Nelson River (Manitoba, Canada), 
Lake Winnipeg (Manitoba, Canada)
Winnipeg River (Manitoba, Canada),  
Lake of the Woods
Red River of the North (Manitoba, Minnesota, North Dakota),

Red River of the North drainage basin

Red River of the North (Manitoba, Minnesota, North Dakota) (length: ,  in Minnesota  
Roseau River (Manitoba, Minnesota), 
Lost River
South Fork Roseau River
Joe River (Manitoba, Minnesota), 
Two Rivers, 
North Branch Two Rivers
Little Joe River
South Branch Two Rivers
Middle Branch Two Rivers
Tamarac River, 
Snake River, 
Middle River
South Branch Snake River
Grand Marais Creek, 
Red Lake River, 
Gentilly River
Black River
Little Black River
Clearwater River, 
Lost River
Poplar River
Hill River
Thief River, 
Lost River
Mud River
Moose River
Red Lake
Sandy River
Mud River
Blackduck River
North Cormorant River
South Cormorant River
Battle River
North Branch Battle River
South Branch Battle River
Tamarac River
Little Tamarac River
Lost River
Sand Hill River, 
Marsh River, 
Wild Rice River, 
South Branch Wild Rice River
White Earth River
Buffalo River, 
South Branch Buffalo River
Otter Tail River, 
Pelican River
Dead River
Toad River
Egg River
Bois de Sioux River, 
Rabbit River
South Fork Rabbit River
Mustinka River,  
Twelvemile Creek
West Branch Twelvemile Creek
West Fork Twelvemile Creek
East Fork Twelvemile Creek

Lake of the Woods drainage basin

Lake of the Woods
Warroad River
East Branch Warroad River
West Branch Warroad River
Rainy River, 
Winter Road River
Baudette River
West Fork Baudette River
Rapid River
East Fork Rapid River
 Barton Brook
Wing River
North Branch Rapid River
Black River
West Fork Black River
South Fork Black River
Big Fork River, 
Bear River
Sturgeon River
Rice River
Popple River
Dunbar River
Bowstring River
Turtle River
Little Fork River, 
 Beaver Brook
Cross River
 Deer River
 Ester Brook
Nett Lake River
Lost River
Rapid River
Valley River
Willow River
Sturgeon River
Bear River
Bearskin River
Dark River
East Branch Sturgeon River
Shannon River
Rice River
Rainy Lake/Kabetogama Lake/Namakan Lake/Crane Lake 
Rat Root River
East Branch Rat Root River
Ash River, 
Black Duck River
Moose River
Johnson River
Vermilion River
Pelican River
Elbow River
Vermilion Lake
Armstrong River
East Two River
West Two River
Pike River
Sand River
Echo River
Hunting Shack River
Loon River
Little Indian Sioux River
Little Pony River
Korb River
Namakan River (Ontario)
Lac la Croix/Crooked Lake
Hustler River
Boulder River
Dahlgren River
Stuart River
Nina Moose River
Oyster River
Moose River
Portage River
Bottle River
Beartrap River
Basswood River
Horse River
Basswood Lake/Fall Lake
Range River
Shagawa River
Burntside River
Dead River
Bear Island River
Beaver River
Kawishiwi River
South Kawishiwi River
Birch Lake
Keeley Creek
Birch River
Isabella River
Little Isabella River
Island River
Dumbbell River
Perent River
Snake River
Stony River
Sand River
Greenwood River
Dunka River
Little Saganaga Lake/Gillis Lake
Frost River
Chub River
Louse River
Phoebe River
Knife River
Knife Lake
Maligne River (Alberta)
Saganaga Lake
Sea Gull River
Granite River
Pine River
Cross River
Tucker River
Long Island River

Alphabetically
Below is a list of 495 of the 6,564 rivers in Minnesota in alphabetical order.  Sections of rivers marked with an * have been designated trout streams by the Minnesota Department of Natural Resources.

A–C

Ahmik River
Ann River
Armstrong River
Artichoke River
Ash River*
Ashley Creek
Badger Creek*
Ball Club River
Baptism River*
Barton Brook
Basswood River
Battle Creek
Battle River
Baudette River
Bear Creek
Bear Island River
Bear River (Big Fork River tributary)
Bear River (Leech Lake River tributary)
Bear River (Sturgeon River tributary)
Bearskin River
Beartrap River
Beaver Brook, tributary of Little Fork River
Beaver Creek (Big Sioux River tributary)
Beaver Creek (Des Moines River tributary)
Beaver River (Bear Island River tributary)
Beaver River (Cloquet River tributary)
Beaver River (Lake Superior)*
Belle Creek (Cannon River tributary)*
Big Fork River
Big Sucker Creek
Big Trout Creek (Winona County)
Birch River
Black Duck River
Black River (Rainy River tributary)
Black River (Red Lake River tributary)
Blackduck River
Blackhoof River*
Blue Earth River
Blueberry River
Bois de Sioux River
Bottle River
Boulder River
Bowstring River
Boy River
Brown's Creek (St. Croix River tributary)*
Brule River*
Buffalo Creek
Buffalo River
Bullard Creek*
Burntside River
Camp Creek (Root River tributary)*
Canfield Creek*
Cannon River
Caribou River*
Cascade River*
Cat River
Cedar River
Chippewa River
Chub River
Clearwater River (Mississippi River tributary)
Clearwater River (Red Lake River tributary)
Cloquet River*
Cobb River
Cottonwood River
Credit River
Crocodile River
Crooked Creek (Mississippi River tributary)
Crooked Creek (Houston County, Minnesota)*
Cross River (Gunflint Lake)
Cross River (Lake Superior)*
Cross River (Little Fork River tributary)
Crow River
Crow Wing River

D–H

Dahlgren River
Dark River
Dead Moose River
Dead River (Burntside River tributary)
Dead River (Otter Tail River tributary)
Deer River (Cross River tributary)
Deer River (Mississippi River tributary)
Des Moines River
Devil Track River*
Diversion Creek
Dumbbell River
Dunbar River
Dunka River
East River
East Branch Baptism River
East Branch Beaver River*
East Branch Blue Earth River
East Branch Chippewa River
East Branch Rat Root River
East Branch Rock River
East Branch Sturgeon River
East Branch Warroad River
East Fork Des Moines River
East Fork Rapid River
East Fork Twelvemile Creek
East Savanna River
East Split Rock River
East Swan River*
East Two River (St. Louis River tributary)
East Two River (Vermilion Lake)
Echo River
Egg River
Elbow River
Elk River
Elm Creek
Embarrass River
Encampment River*
Ester Brook
Fall River*
First River
Fish Hook River
Flandreau Creek
Floodwood River
Flute Reed River*
French River
Frost River
Gentilly River
Gooseberry River*
Grand Marais Creek
Granite River
Greenwood River (Brule River tributary)*
Greenwood River (Stony River tributary)
Grindstone River
Groundhouse River
Gull River (Crow Wing River tributary)
Gull River (Turtle River tributary)
Hawk Creek
Hay Creek*
Heron Lake Outlet
High Island Creek
Hill River (Lost River tributary)
Hill River (Willow River tributary)
Horse River
Hunting Shack River
Hustler River

I–L

Isabella River
Island River
Jack Creek
Joe River
Johnson River
Kabekona River
Kadunce River
Kawishiwi River
Keeley Creek
Kelso River
Kettle River (Blueberry River tributary)
Kettle River (Minnesota), tributary of St. Croix River
Kimball Creek
Knife River (Lake Superior)*
Knife River, tributary of Birch Lake
Knife River (Snake River tributary)
Korb River
Lac qui Parle River
Langley River
Le Sueur River
Leaf River
Leech Lake River
Lester River*
Lime Creek (Des Moines River tributary)
Lime Creek (Winnebago River tributary)
Little Ann River
Little Black River
Little Cannon River (Cannon River tributary)*
Little Cannon River (Sabre Lake)
Little Cedar River (Dodge County, Minnesota), a tributary of the Cedar River entirely in Dodge County
Little Cedar River (Iowa and Minnesota), a tributary of the Cedar River rising in Mower County, Minnesota
Little Chippewa River
Little Cloquet River
Little Cobb River
Little Cottonwood River
Little Devil Track River
Little Elk River
Little Fork River
Little Gooseberry River
Little Hill River
Little Indian Sioux River
Little Iowa River
Little Isabella River*
Little Joe River
Little Knife River (Lake County, Minnesota)
Little Knife River (St. Louis County, Minnesota)
Little Langley River
Little Le Sueur River
Little Manitou River*
Little Marais River
Little Minnesota River
Little Mississippi River
Little Net River*
Little Nokasippi River
Little Partridge River
Little Pine River
Little Pony River
Little River
Little Rock River
Little Sioux River
Little Stewart River*
Little Sucker River
Little Swan River
Little Tamarac River
Little Tamarack River
Little Trout Valley (Winona County)*
Little Two River
Little Whiteface River (North), located east of Meadowlands
Little Whiteface River (South), located south of Meadowlands
Little Willow River (Mississippi River tributary)
Little Willow River (Willow River tributary)
Long Island River
Long Prairie River
Loon River
Lost River (Clearwater River tributary)
Lost River (Nett Lake)
Lost River (Roseau River tributary)
Lost River (Tamarac River tributary)
Lost River (Thief River tributary)
Louse River
Lower Stump River
Lower Tamarack River

M–O

Manitou River*
Maple River
Marsh River
McCarty River
Middle River
Middle Branch Blue Earth River
Middle Branch Root River*
Middle Branch Rush River
Middle Branch Two Rivers
Middle Fork Crow River
Middle Fork Whitewater River*
Middle Fork Zumbro River
Midway River*
Minnesota River
Mississippi River
Money Creek (Root River tributary)*
Moose Horn River
Moose River (Namakan Lake)
Moose River (Nina Moose River tributary)
Moose River (Thief Lake)
Moose River (Willow River tributary)
Mud River (Red Lake)
Mud River (Thief River tributary)
Mustinka River
Necktie River
Nemadji River*
Net River*
Nett Lake River
Nina Moose River
Nokasippi River
North River
North Branch Battle River
North Branch Cascade River
North Branch Grindstone River
North Branch Middle Fork Zumbro River
North Branch Rapid River
North Branch Root River*
North Branch Rush River
North Branch Sunrise River
North Branch Two Rivers
North Branch Upper Iowa River
North Branch Whiteface River
North Branch Yellow Medicine River
North Cannon River
North Cormorant River
North Fork Crooked Creek
North Fork Crow River
North Fork Watab River
North Fork Watonwan River
North Fork Whitewater River*
North Fork Willow River
North Fork Yellow Bank River
North Fork Zumbro River
North Turtle River
North Two River
Ocheyedan River
Okabena Creek
Onion River*
Otter River
Otter Tail River
Oyster River

P–R

Paleface River
Partridge River (Crow Wing River tributary)
Partridge River (St. Louis River tributary)
Pelican River (Otter Tail River tributary)
Pelican River (Vermilion River tributary)
Perch Creek
Perent River
Phoebe River
Pigeon River (Minnesota–Ontario), tributary of Lake Superior
Pigeon River (Mississippi River tributary)
Pike River
Pine Creek (Mississippi River tributary)
Pine Creek (Upper Iowa River tributary)
Pine Creek (Rush Creek tributary)*
Pine River (Kettle River tributary)
Pine River (Minnesota–Ontario), tributary of Granite River
Pine River (Mississippi River tributary)
Pine River (Saint Louis River tributary)*
Pipestone Creek
Platte River
Plum Creek
Pokegama River
Pomme de Terre River
Poplar River (Lake Superior)*
Poplar River (Lost River tributary)
Popple River
Portage River (Fish Hook River tributary)
Portage River (Moose Horn River tributary)
Portage River (Nina Moose River tributary)
Potato River
Prairie River (Big Sandy Lake)
Prairie River (Mississippi River tributary)
Rabbit River (Bois de Sioux)
Rabbit River (Mississippi River tributary)
Rainy River
Range River
Rapid River (Little Fork River tributary)
Rapid River (Rainy River tributary)
Rat Root River
Red Lake River
Red River
Red River of the North
Redeye River
Redwood River
Reservation River
Rice Creek
Rice River (Big Fork River tributary)
Rice River (Little Fork River tributary)
Rice River (Mississippi River tributary)
Riceford Creek*
Ripple River
Rock River
Rollingstone Creek*
Root River
Roseau River
Royal River
Rum River
Rush Creek (Root River tributary)*
Rush River

S

St. Croix River
St. Francis River
St. Louis River
Sand Creek (Minnesota River tributary)
Sand Creek (St. Croix River tributary)
Sand Hill River
Sand River (Pike River tributary)
Sand River (Stony River tributary)
Sandy River (Mississippi River tributary)
Sandy River (Red Lake)
Sauk River
Sawbill Creek
Schoolcraft River
Sea Gull River
Shagawa River
Shakopee Creek
Shannon River
Shell River
Shell Rock River
Shingobee River
Skunk Creek
Skunk River (Crow River tributary)
Skunk River (Platte River tributary)
Sleepy Eye Creek
Snake River (Elk River tributary)
Snake River (Isabella River tributary)
Snake River (Red River of the North tributary)
Snake River (St. Croix River tributary)
South Branch Battle River
South Branch Buffalo River
South Branch Grindstone River
South Branch Little Elk River
South Branch Manitou River*
South Branch Middle Fork Zumbro River
South Branch Partridge River
South Branch Root River*
South Branch Rush River
South Branch Snake River
South Branch Sunrise River
South Branch Two Rivers
South Branch Vermillion River
South Branch Whiteface River
South Branch Wild Rice River
South Branch Yellow Medicine River
South Brule River
South Cormorant River
South Kawishiwi River
South Fork Black River
South Fork Crooked Creek
South Fork Crow River
South Fork Groundhouse River
South Fork Nemadji River
South Fork Pine River
South Fork Rabbit River
South Fork Root River*
South Fork Roseau River
South Fork Watab River
South Fork Watonwan River
South Fork Whitewater River*
South Fork Willow River
South Fork Yellow Bank River
South Fork Zumbro River
South Two River
Split Rock River (tributary of Lake Superior)*
Split Rock River (Kettle River tributary)
Spring Creek
Spring Branch Swan River
Spring Valley Creek (Fillmore and Mower Counties)*
Stanchfield Creek
Steamboat River
Stewart River*
Stony River
Straight River (central Minnesota) (tributary of Fish Hook River)
Straight River (southern Minnesota) (tributary of Cannon River)*
Stuart River
Stump River
Sturgeon River (Big Fork River tributary)
Sturgeon River (Little Fork River tributary)
Sunrise River
Swamp River
Swan River (central Minnesota)
Swan River (northern Minnesota)
Swift River

T–Z

Tait River
Talmadge River*
Tamarac River (Red Lake)
Tamarac River (Red River of the North tributary)
Tamarack River
Temperance River*
Thief River
Third River
Thompson Creek (Root River tributary)*
Toad River
Trout Brook (Anoka and Wright Counties)
Trout Brook (Dakota and Goodhue Counties)*
Trout Brook (Pine County)
Trout Brook (Ramsey County, Minnesota)
Trout Brook (Wabasha County, Minnesota)*
Trout Brook, Mazeppa Creek (Wabasha and Goodhue Counties)*
Trout Brook (Washington County, Minnesota)*
Trout Creek (Todd County)
Trout Creek (Itasca County)
Trout Creek (Winona County)
Trout Ponds Creek (Winona)*
Trout Run (Winona County, Whitewater Watershed)*
Trout Run (Filmore and Winona Counties)*
Tucker River
Turtle River (Bowstring River tributary)
Turtle River (Mississippi River tributary)
Twelvemile Creek
Two Island River*
Two River (Mississippi River tributary)
Two Rivers (Red River of the North tributary)
Upper Iowa River
Upper Tamarack River
Us-kab-wan-ka River*
Valley Creek
Valley River
Vermilion River (Itasca County)
Vermillion River (Dakota County)*
Vern River
Wapsipinicon River
Warroad River
Watab River
Watonwan River
Watson Creek (Minnesota)*
Wells Creek
West Branch Baptism River
West Branch Beaver River
West Branch Blue Earth River
West Branch Cloquet River
West Branch Floodwood River
West Branch Kettle River
West Branch Knife River
West Branch Lac qui Parle River
West Branch Onion River
West Branch Rum River
West Branch St. Francis River
West Branch Sunrise River
West Branch Twelvemile Creek
West Branch Warroad River
West Fork Baudette River
West Fork Black River
West Fork Groundhouse River
West Fork Little Sioux River
West Fork Moose Horn River
West Fork Prairie River
West Fork Twelvemile Creek
West Savanna River
West Split Rock River
West Swan River
West Two River (St. Louis River tributary)
West Two River (Vermilion Lake)
Whetstone River
White Earth River
Whiteface River
Whitewater River*
Wild Rice River
Wildcat Creek (Minnesota)*
Whitney Brook
Willow River (Kettle River tributary)
Willow River (Little Fork River tributary)
Willow River (Mississippi River tributary)
Wing River (Leaf River tributary)
Wing River (Rapid River tributary)
Winnebago Creek*
Winter Road River
Wisel Creek*
Yellow Bank River
Yellow Medicine River
Zumbro River

See also

:Category:Rivers of Minnesota by county
List of lakes in Minnesota
List of longest streams of Minnesota

References

USGS Hydrologic Unit Map – State of Minnesota (DOI: 1974), published: 1976

External links
Minnesota Streamflow Data from the USGS

Minnesota
Rivers